Michele de Bologna, C.R. (1647–1731) was a Roman Catholic prelate who served as Archbishop of Amalfi (1701–1731) and Bishop of Isernia (1690–1698).

Biography
Michele de Bologna was born in Somma, Italy, on 29 September 1647 and ordained a priest in the Congregation of Clerics Regular of the Divine Providence in October 1663. On 6 March 1690, he was appointed during the papacy of Pope Alexander VIII as Bishop of Isernia. On 12 March 1690, he was consecrated bishop by Pietro Francesco Orsini de Gravina, Archbishop of Benevento, with Giuseppe Bologna, Archbishop Emeritus of Benevento, and Gregorio Giuseppe Gaetani de Aragonia, Titular Archbishop of Neocaesarea in Ponto, serving as co-consecrators. He resigned on 11 December 1698. 

On 14 March 1701, he was appointed during the papacy of Pope Clement XI as Archbishop of Amalfi. He served as Archbishop of Amalfi until his death on 24 February 1731, restyling the Cathedral during his time in office there.

Episcopal succession
While bishop, he was the principal co-consecrator of:
Giuseppe Maria Pignatelli, Bishop of Cava de' Tirreni (1696); 
Lorenzo Fabri, Bishop of Fossombrone (1697);
Giacinto della Calce, Bishop of Ariano (1697); and 
Tommaso Maria Franza, Bishop of Oria (1697).

References

External links and additional sources
 (for Chronology of Bishops) 
 (for Chronology of Bishops)  
 (for Chronology of Bishops) 
 (for Chronology of Bishops)  

17th-century Italian Roman Catholic bishops
18th-century Italian Roman Catholic archbishops
Bishops appointed by Pope Alexander VIII
Bishops appointed by Pope Clement XI
1647 births
1731 deaths
Theatine bishops